Edit Klocker (born 16 October 1979) is a retired Hungarian butterfly swimmer who won a silver medal in the 4×100 m medley relay at the 1995 European Aquatics Championships. She also competed in the 100 m and 200 m butterfly and 4×100 m medley relay events at the 1996 Summer Olympics.

References

1979 births
Living people
Hungarian female butterfly swimmers
Olympic swimmers of Hungary
Swimmers at the 1996 Summer Olympics
European Aquatics Championships medalists in swimming
People from Baja, Hungary
Sportspeople from Bács-Kiskun County
20th-century Hungarian women
21st-century Hungarian women